Knut Are Tvedt (born 29 April 1952) is a Norwegian encyclopedist.

He is the editor of the encyclopedias Store norske leksikon and Oslo byleksikon. His main interests are the history and politics of Oslo.

References

1952 births
Living people
Norwegian encyclopedists